Samuel Fransisco Rumkabu (born February 21, 1989 in Abepura) is an Indonesian footballer that currently plays for Persidafon Dafonsoro in the Indonesia Super League.

References

External links

1989 births
Living people
Indonesian footballers
Persidafon Dafonsoro players
Liga 1 (Indonesia) players
Association football midfielders
Sportspeople from Papua